Thyra Schmidt (1974)  is a German visual artist.

Life and work 
Schmidt studied fine arts from 1996 to 2000 at the University of Applied Sciences and Arts in Hannover, under Peter Tuma, and in 1999/2000 at the Hiroshima City University, Faculty of Art, Japan. From 2000 to 2001 she studied under Dörte Eißfeldt at the Braunschweig University of Art, and from 2001 to 2005 under Thomas Ruff at the Kunstakademie Düsseldorf. She lives and works in Düsseldorf. 

In her work, Schmidt combines photographic and film techniques with predominately self written texts and develops installations for indoor and outdoor spaces. "They are interpersonal events, often based on personal experience, which she reflects in a poetically constructed manner."

At invitation by the Norwegian Goethe-Institut, Schmidt realized the art project I can't just be nowhere in the city center of Oslo, Norway, in 2009. "The title I can't just be nowhere speaks to the character of the Oslo installation in the public space and refers to the essentials in Schmidt’s work, namely the presence of the human figure, the particular moment and the relationship to the location. The photos and expressions that were projected on posters on buildings often related closely to the architectural context. They are large format photographic and text works with privately looking themes and are positioned onto various exterior surfaces of houses, public buildings or shops. This connected installation, which covered eleven sites in three inner urban districts of Oslo, assume ambivalence, as they oscillate between the intimate and the public."

In 2017, during her artist residence in Hongcheon, South Korea, Thyra Schmidt created the art work Two friends leave the room and walk in different directions – the sentence was translated into Korean and was exposed as textile banner at the facade of the Hongcheon Art Museum for the group exhibition Moving Shadow.
The artist's “sentence contrasts the commercial messages. For the Korean public it had more a private or a complex philosophical character. […] Others, notably European beholders, saw a more political inspired reference. This might be evident, with regard to the location in South Korea and its historical separation of North Korea.” Thyra Schmidt “does not want to specify any interpretation. In the contrary, she hopes that ʽwhen read, an imaginary picture emerges. In the best case, many changing images. Images that evoke different associations. Images that allow complex interpretations.ʼ(Artist statement)”

Teaching 
From 2015 to 2017 Thyra Schmidt had a lectureship for artistic photography at the Institute for Art & Art theory at the University of Cologne.

Publications (selection) 
 2005 Muse heute, exhibition catalogue, ed. Kunsthalle Bremen
 2010 Thyra Schmidt, I can’t just be nowhere, texts by Anne Rodler and Thomas W. Rieger, extra Verlag,  
 2012 Fehlstelle, artist book, text by Valeria Liebermann, ed. Städtische Galerie Offenburg, modo Verlag, 
 2019 Über Diebe und die Liebe / On Thieves and Love, artist's book, artist's text, Edition Cantz,

References

External links 
 
 Literature by and about Schmidt in the German National Library
 Art works from Thyra Schmidt at Martin Leyer-Pritzkow

New media artists
Photographers from North Rhine-Westphalia
German contemporary artists
20th-century German women artists
21st-century German women artists
Artists from Düsseldorf
Living people
1974 births
German women photographers
20th-century women photographers
21st-century women photographers